Alexander Dalway  was an Irish politician.

Dalway  was born in Carrickfergus and educated at  Trinity College, Dublin.

Dalway  represented Carrickfergus from 1715 to 1719.

References

Irish MPs 1715–1727
Members of the Parliament of Ireland (pre-1801) for County Antrim constituencies
18th-century Irish people
People from Carrickfergus
Alumni of Trinity College Dublin